Daniel, Dan, or Danny Brown may refer to:

 Danny Brown (born 1981), American hip hop recording artist
 Daniel McGillivray Brown (1923–2012), Scottish chemist 
 Daniel Q. Brown (fl. 1960s–1970s), American Old Catholic bishop
 Daniel Russell Brown (1848–1919), American politician, governor of Rhode Island
 Dee Brown (basketball, born 1984) (Daniel Brown), American basketball player
 Danny Brown (American football) (1925–1995), American football defensive end
 Danny Brown (footballer) (born 1980), English footballer
 Danny Joe Brown (1951–2005), American musician
 Dan Brown (born 1964), American author of thriller fiction, including The Da Vinci Code
 Dan Brown (blogger) (born 1990), American internet blogger and YouTube celebrity
 Dan W. Brown (1950–2021), American politician and veterinarian
 Dan Brown, guitarist with The Amity Affliction (2013–present) 
 Daniel Brown (cricketer) (1908–1972), South African cricketer
 Daniel Brown (politician) (born 1945), American politician, city councilman and acting mayor of the city of Knoxville, Tennessee
 Daniel Brown (racing driver) (born 1991), British racing driver
 Daniel James Brown (born 1951), American nonfiction writer
 Daniel Brown (American football) (born 1992), American football player
 Daniel W. Brown, Pakistani author of books on Islam
 Daniel Brown (rower) (born 1982), British para rower
 Daniel P. Brown (1948–2022), US-American psychologist, psychotherapist, author and translator

See also
 Daniel Browne (born 1979), rugby union player from New Zealand
 Dan Browne (born 1974), American distance runner
 Dan Braun (born 1961), American musician